Georgette Seabrooke (aka Georgette Seabrooke Powell; August 2, 1916 – December 27, 2011), was an American muralist, artist, illustrator, art therapist, non-profit chief executive and educator. She is best known for her 1936 mural, Recreation in Harlem at Harlem Hospital in New York City, which was restored and put on public display in 2012 after being hidden from view for many years.

Biography
Early life and education

Seabrooke was born in Charleston, South Carolina, the only child of George and Anna Seabrooke. Her family moved to New York City in 1920. George died when Georgette was a young child. Her mother was a domestic housekeeper, and Georgette worked with her while quite young, but she did well in school and graduated from Washington Irving High School. She also studied with James Lesesne Wells at the Harlem Art Workshop, and with Gwendolyn B. Bennett at the Harlem Community Art Center.

In 1933, at the age of 17, she was admitted to the prestigious Cooper Union School of Art in New York, where in 1935 she received the school's Silver Medal, its highest honor, for a painting entitled "Church Scene." Cooper Union denied Seabrooke her diploma in 1937 for what it said at the time was incomplete work, but six decades later, in 1997, it invited Seabrooke back to its campus to honor her achievements. In 2008 Cooper Union presented Seabrooke with a lifetime achievement award, and the school now considers her a member of its class of 1937.

 Recreation in Harlem and the WPA

While studying at Cooper Union, Seabrooke was chosen by the Federal Art Project of the Works Progress Administration (WPA) as one of four "master artists" to paint murals at Harlem Hospital. She was the youngest artist so chosen and the only female. The mural she painted, Recreation in Harlem, is nearly 20 feet long and depicts daily life in Harlem in the 1930s, including women chatting through a window and children performing in a choir.  The hospital's management was not pleased with her depiction of an all-black Harlem community as they did not want to be known as a "Negro hospital." Seabrooke added eight white characters to the mural, but obscured their race in some cases and turned their face from the viewer in others. (This last piece of information is not verified on the site and conflicts with information elsewhere.) Seabrooke also received a WPA commission to paint a mural at Queens General Hospital, now known as Queens Hospital Center, in Jamaica, Queens, New York.

In 2012, after being hidden from public view for many years and after surviving damage from a fire and being painted over, Recreation in Harlem and the other murals at Harlem Hospital were restored and placed on public view in the hospital's new Mural Pavilion.

Later years and legacy

Seabrooke married Dr. George Wesley Powell in 1939. They remained married until 1959 and had three children. During this period she illustrated calendars and magazines, and she studied theater design at Fordham University.

Seabrooke moved to Washington, D.C., in 1959. In 1970, she founded Operation Heritage Art Center, now known as Tomorrow's World Art Center. In 1972 she became a registered art therapist, and the following year earned her Bachelor of Fine Arts from Howard University. She was very active in combining art with mental health therapy, teaching at the Tomorrow's World Art Center, and at a series of events in Malcolm X Park known as "Art in the Park". During the 1970s and 1980s, a time when Washington had a growing homeless population, Seabrooke painted a series of portraits of homeless men and women which emphasized their plight but also imbued them with humanity.

Near the end of her life, Seabrooke moved to Palm Coast, Florida. Though she became too ill to continue making art, she remained involved in art therapy and art fundraising until her death, due to cancer, on December 27, 2011. Seabrooke's work appeared in 72 major exhibitions between 1933 and 2003 in the United States, Senegal, Venezuela, and Nigeria. Her works hang in distinguished collections around the United States.

Works

 Recreation in Harlem - Harlem Hospital Center - New York City, New York
 Grandmothers's Birthday - Johnson Publishing Company - Chicago, Illinois
 Hampton Institute - Hampton, Virginia
 New York Public Library - New York City, New York
 Anacostia Museum - Washington D.C.
 Library of Congress - Washington D.C.
 Baltimore Museum of Art - Baltimore, Maryland
 Chicago Public Library - Chicago, Illinois
 Center for African American History and Culture - Washington D.C.

Awards

 1935: Cooper Union School of Fine Arts - Silver medal for painting
 2001: Washington D.C. Commission on the Arts
 2002: D.C. Hall of Fame Society - Legacy Award
 2005: Duke Ellington School of Arts
 2008: Art Therapy Pioneer Award - American Art Therapy Association

Exhibits
 1993: "Radiance and Reality" (one woman show) - Children's National Medical Center in Washington, D.C.
 1995: "Art Changes Things" - Smithsonian Institution - Anacostia Museum

See also
List of Federal Art Project artists

References

Further reading
 Farrington, Lisa E., (2005). - Creating Their Own Image: The History of African-American Women Artists. - New York: Oxford University Press. 
 Heller, Jules and Nancy G. Heller, (1995). - North American Women Artists of the Twentieth Century: A Biographical Dictionary. - New York: Garland. 
 Faxon, Alicia Craig, (2005) - Woman's Art Journal, Vol. 26, Issue 2

External links

 Recreation in Harlem - Columbia University Institute for Research in African-American Studies - this website has much information on all the WPA murals at Harlem Hospital
 TheHistoryMakers.com: Georgette Seabrooke Powell - Oral history website features and interview with the artist and some information on her works
 Renaissance Woman - A 2008 video featuring an interview with Georgette Seabrooke Powell and several images of her paintings, made by the Daytona Beach News-Journal
 'Join Our Effort to Restore a Historic WPA Mural in Harlem' - A website soliciting donations to restore Recreation in Harlem with several photographs
 PIONEER PROFILE: GEORGETTE SEABROOK POWELL (A’37)
 Obituary

Federal Art Project artists
American muralists
Artists from Charleston, South Carolina
People from Yorkville, Manhattan
Howard University alumni
1916 births
2011 deaths
Art therapists
American women painters
20th-century American women artists
Women muralists
21st-century American women